The Big Sleep is a 1978 neo-noir film, the second film version of Raymond Chandler's 1939 novel of the same name. The picture was directed by Michael Winner and stars Robert Mitchum in his second film portrayal of the detective Philip Marlowe (following Farewell, My Lovely three years earlier). The cast includes Sarah Miles, Candy Clark, Joan Collins, and Oliver Reed, also featuring James Stewart as General Sternwood.

The story's setting was changed from 1940s Los Angeles to 1970s London. The film contained material more explicit than what could only be hinted at in the 1946 version, such as homosexuality, pornography, and nudity. Mitchum was 60 at the time of filming, far older than Chandler's 33-year-old Marlowe (or the 1946 film's 38-year-old Marlowe played by Bogart who was 44 at the time).

Plot
In 1970s England, private detective Philip Marlowe (Robert Mitchum) is asked to the stately home of General Sternwood (James Stewart), who hires Marlowe to learn who is blackmailing him. While at the mansion, he meets the general's spoiled and inquisitive daughter Charlotte (Sarah Miles) and wild younger daughter Camilla (Candy Clark).

Marlowe's investigation of the homosexual pornographer Arthur Geiger (John Justin) leads him to Agnes Lozelle (Joan Collins), an employee of Geiger, and to Joe Brody (Edward Fox), a man that Agnes has taken up with. He also discovers Camilla at the scene of Geiger's murder, where she has posed for nude photographs, and takes her home safely to a grateful Charlotte.

Returning to the crime scene, Marlowe is interrupted by gambler Eddie Mars (Oliver Reed), who owns the house where Geiger's body was found. Mars' wife Mona hasn't been seen in a while and may have run off with Rusty Regan (David Savile), Charlotte's missing husband. Due to Charlotte Regan's gambling debts, Mars appears to have a hold over Charlotte as well.

Camilla tries to get her pictures back from Brody, who is now in possession of them. Marlowe intervenes but Brody is shot and killed by someone unseen.

A man named Harry Jones (Colin Blakely) comes to Marlowe with a proposition. He is working with Agnes now, and she is willing to sell information as to Mrs. Mars' whereabouts. But on the night Marlowe shows up for their meeting, Harry is poisoned by Lash Canino (Richard Boone), a hit man working for Eddie Mars.

Marlowe pays Agnes for the address. He tracks down Canino at a remote garage, where he is overpowered and taken prisoner. Mars' supposedly missing wife Mona (Diana Quick) is there as well. At a moment when Canino is out, Marlowe persuades her to set him free. In a shootout, he then kills Canino.

Camilla appears to be grateful to Marlowe and asks him to teach her how to use the gun so that she can protect herself. He takes her to a wood and sets up an empty can on the ruins of a Roman castle for her to use as a target. She points the gun at him and pulls the trigger repeatedly, but Marlowe was prepared for this and had given her a gun loaded with blanks. She becomes hysterical at the ruse and he takes her home. It turns out that the emotionally disturbed Camilla had murdered her sister's husband Rusty and that Charlotte had covered everything up with Eddie Mars' help.

After confronting Charlotte with the facts, Marlowe tells her to have Camilla hospitalized. He then drives away from the Sternwood residence the same way he came in, hoping that the gravely ill general will never know the complete truth.

Cast
 Robert Mitchum as Philip Marlowe
 Sarah Miles as Charlotte Sternwood Regan
 Richard Boone as Lash Canino
 Candy Clark as Camilla Sternwood
 Joan Collins as Agnes Lozelle
 Edward Fox as Joe Brody
 John Mills as Inspector Jim Carson
 James Stewart as General Sternwood
 Oliver Reed as Eddie Mars
 Harry Andrews as Norris the butler
 Colin Blakely as Harry Jones
 Richard Todd as Commander Barker
 Diana Quick as Mona Grant
 James Donald as Inspector Gregory
 John Justin as Arthur Geiger
 Simon Fisher Turner as Karl Lundgren
 Martin Potter as Owen Taylor

Production
The film was originally developed for United Artists, as when that studio bought the Warner Bros. library they obtained the remake rights. It went to the Rank Organisation before eventually finding finance via Lew Grade. Michael Winner said an American was meant to adapt it but did not agree with changing the locale to Britain so Winner did it first. "I've changed the storyline far less than in the Hawks film", said Winner.

Diana Quick performs the song "Won't Somebody Dance with Me", a ballad composed by Lynsey De Paul.

Critical response
Roger Ebert gave the film 2.5 stars out of 4 and wrote that "despite all the great costumes and sets and London locations they’re given to work with, the actors don’t seem engaged". Janet Maslin of The New York Times described the film as "senselessly gaudy" and "overloaded with big names, and in this case the net effect of an all-star cast is to make an already confusing mystery even harder to follow". Gene Siskel of the Chicago Tribune gave the film 1.5 stars out of 4 and wrote: "All of the zigs and zags of the original story are in the remake; what's missing is the enthusiasm. Talented actors such as Edward Fox and Oliver Reed sleepwalk through their parts." Kevin Thomas of the Los Angeles Times panned the film as "a flat, routine procedural detective mystery utterly devoid of any film noir atmosphere". Arthur D. Murphy of Variety wrote: "The production is handsome, but in the updating and relocation a lot has been lost." Gary Arnold of The Washington Post wrote: "Everything is out of whack in this transposition of Chandler's material. The actors seem to be going through the motions, but they look wrong, sound wrong and inhabit the wrong settings." John Pym of The Monthly Film Bulletin wrote that the location and time change had "destroyed the crucial geographical and temporal context of Chandler's novel; almost every aspect of the narrative now seems ludicrously out of place". He added that Winner "ploughs step by step through the complicated plot with a curious lack of interest in, among other things, the nature of his hero's character".

Home media
The Big Sleep has been released twice on DVD:

 Artisan Home Video (now Lionsgate) under license from Carlton Media (successor in interest to ITC Entertainment) on April 30, 2002 as a Region 1 fullscreen DVD.
 Shout Factory, under license from ITV Studios (successor in interest to ITC Entertainment and Carlton Media) on September 23, 2014 as a Region 1 widescreen DVD.

The Big Sleep was released in high-definition on Blu-ray by Shout Factory on February 20, 2018 as part of a two movie package along with Farewell, My Lovely (1975 remake). Both the 1946 version (featuring Humphrey Bogart) and this version have been released on Blu-ray.

References

Further reading
 Tibbetts, John C., and James M. Welsh, eds. The Encyclopedia of Novels Into Film (2nd ed. 2005) pp 32–33.

External links
 
 
 
 
 

1978 films
1978 crime films
British crime films
British neo-noir films
Films based on American novels
Films based on mystery novels
American detective films
British detective films
Films directed by Michael Winner
Films scored by Jerry Fielding
Films set in the 1970s
Films set in London
ITC Entertainment films
United Artists films
Films based on works by Raymond Chandler
American crime films
American neo-noir films
Films produced by Elliott Kastner
Films with screenplays by Michael Winner
Films produced by Michael Winner
1970s English-language films
1970s American films
1970s British films